Before the Amplifiers, Live Acoustic is Sister Hazel's first live acoustic album. It was released on June 17, 2008. It was recorded in Atlanta, Georgia, and includes songs from throughout their entire career. The album charted on the Billboard 200 at #152, and at #19 on the Top Independent Albums chart. An International release is available with a second disc containing five extra tracks. Three of these are live acoustic tracks and two have been taken from the B-sides release BAM! Volume 1.

Track listing

International Bonus Disc

References 

Sister Hazel albums
2008 live albums